Coleophora audeoudi is a species of moth in the family Coleophoridae. It is found in North Macedonia and Turkey.

References

audeoudi
Moths described in 1935
Moths of Europe
Moths of Asia